Fodé Fofana (born 26 October 2002) is a Dutch professional footballer who plays as a forward for Eerste Divisie team Jong PSV.

Club career
Fofana started his career by playing youth football for several amateur clubs in Groningen including GVAV-Rapiditas. During his family's summer vacation in 2012, Fofana played a street football tournament at Lyon where a scout of Barcelona was present. He was impressed by Fofana's style of play and recommended him to the club. Fofana joined Barcelona following year after two internships at the club. However, he was forced to leave the club after two years as FIFA imposed a sanction on Barcelona for buying players aged under 18. He returned to Netherlands after leaving Barcelona and joined PSV later.

On 2 August 2019, PSV announced that three 16-year-olds from their youth academy including Fofana have signed their first professional contract with the club. He signed a three-year contract through to the summer of 2022. He made his professional debut for Jong PSV on 6 November 2020 in a 2–1 league win against Den Bosch. He played whole 90 minutes in the match and scored his team's both goals.

On 7 July 2021, Fofana made his first appearance for PSV by scoring a hat-trick in 10–1 friendly win against Delbrücker SC. After being an unused substitute in 2021 Johan Cruyff Shield win against Ajax, he made his official debut for PSV on 10 August in a UEFA Champions League qualifying match against Midtjylland.

On 20 August 2021, Fofana extended his contract with PSV until June 2025.

International career
Fofana is a Dutch youth international. On 27 August 2021, he received maiden call-up to Netherlands under-21 team for 2023 UEFA European Under-21 Championship qualification matches. On 7 September, he made his Dutch youth team debut by coming on as an 83rd-minute substitute for Brian Brobbey in 3–0 win against Moldova.

Personal life
Fofana was born in Groningen to Uljana and Abdoul Fofana. His mother is from Russia and father is from Guinea.

Career statistics

Club

Honours
PSV
 KNVB Cup: 2021–22
 Johan Cruyff Shield: 2021

References

External links
 

2002 births
Living people
Footballers from Groningen (city)
Dutch footballers
Dutch people of Guinean descent
Dutch people of Russian descent
Association football forwards
Eerste Divisie players
Jong PSV players